Choi Jun-Hee is the name of:

Juniel (born 1993), South Korean singer and songwriter
Jun Choi (born 1971), American politician, former Mayor of Edison, New Jersey